The Aquinas College Chapel, formally known as the Chapel of St Thomas Aquinas, is a heritage-listed building located on the Aquinas College property in Salter Point, Western Australia. The building is owned by the Christian Brothers as part of the Aquinas College property.

History 
The chapel was officially opened on 12 August 1966, which was described in the college annual as "the greatest day in the long history of the college".

In 1961 an appeal had been launched to raise funds for extensions to the college. Br. Hall's request to the Christian Brothers for support of the project included costings for a chapel at AU£25,000. When Br. Woodruff totalled up the payments to take the chapel to furnished completion, figures came out at AU£83,370.

The chapel was heritage listed by the Heritage Council of Western Australia on 1 May 1989.

Services 
Regular chapel services are held on Thursday mornings for all students, and special services for boarders are held on Sunday evenings. The chapel also plays host to baptisms, holy communions, confirmation, weddings and funerals.

See also 
 Albert Edwin Lynch – Served as priest from 1938 to 1942

References

Further reading 
 Florey, Cecil (2000), Canning Bridge to Clontarf: An Historical Journey Along Manning Road
 Massam, Katharine (1998). On High Ground: Images of One Hundred Years at Aquinas College, Western Australia University of Western Australia Press 

Aquinas College, Perth
State Register of Heritage Places in the City of South Perth
Roman Catholic churches in Perth, Western Australia